Jutaku or kyosho jutaku (Japanese: 狭小住宅] is a Japanese architectural style focused on delivering original, "micro-home" designs on very small plots of real estate.

History
The Jutaku phenomenon rose in the 1990s as Japan's real estate plots kept getting smaller from the inheritance system and the island's growing population. According to the architect Kengo Kuma, the first traces of Jutaku are in the writings of the poet Kamo no Chōmei and the description of the small house he lived in.

The development of smaller, capsule homes also came from the capsule hotel trend that was launched in the country with the building in 1974 of the Nakagin Capsule Tower.

Description
Jutaku simply means "house" in Japanese. Jutaku houses and buildings focus on minimalist, multifunctional spaces to make up for the small plots they are built on. Jutaku houses often do not blend with the background of a city, making the architectural style fit for individualist-oriented cultures. Jutaku houses and buildings often have contorted geometries, daring feats of structural engineering, and other awkward site circumstances.

According to the Japanese architect Yasuhiro Yamashita, a Jutaku house is awkward, built towards the sky, nature-sensitive, personalized, monochrome, built with reflective materials and hiddens storage areas.

Examples
 4x4 house in Tarumi-ku, Kobe, designed by Ando Tadao
 Layer House, designed by Hiroaki Ohtani
 Lucky Drops, in Tokyo, designed by Yasuhiro Yamashita

Further reading
Naomi Pollock (2015), Jutaku: Japanese Houses. Phaidon Press.

See also
List of architectural styles
Japanese architecture

References

Architecture in Japan
Japanese home